John Benjamin Gedney (June 4, 1809 – 1859) was an American politician from New York.

Life
He was a member of the Gedney family, and lived at White Plains, Westchester County, New York. He married Ann McFarquhar (d. 1890).

He was one of the first three Inspectors of State Prisons elected on the Whig ticket in 1847 under the New York State Constitution of 1846, and drew the one-year term, being in office in 1848.

Sources
 Gedney genealogy, at RootsWeb
The New York Civil List compiled by Franklin Benjamin Hough (page 45; Weed, Parsons and Co., 1858)
 His wife's death notice, in NYT on October 16, 1890

1809 births
1859 deaths
People from White Plains, New York
New York State Prison Inspectors
New York (state) Whigs
19th-century American politicians